Alpha Persei (Latinized from α Persei, abbreviated Alpha Per, α Per), formally named Mirfak (pronounced  or ), is the brightest star in the northern constellation of Perseus, outshining the constellation's best-known star, Algol. Alpha Persei has an apparent visual magnitude of 1.8, and is a circumpolar star when viewed from mid-northern latitudes.

Alpha Persei lies in the midst of a cluster of stars named as the eponymous Alpha Persei Cluster, or Melotte 20, which is easily visible in binoculars and includes many of the fainter stars in the constellation. Determined distance using the trigonometric parallax, places the star  from the Sun.

Nomenclature 
α Persei is the star's Bayer designation.

The star also bore the traditional names Mirfak and Algenib, which are Arabic in origin. The former, meaning 'Elbow' and also written Mirphak, Marfak or Mirzac, comes from the Arabic Mirfaq al-Thurayya, while Algenib, also spelt Algeneb, Elgenab, Gęnib, Chenib or Alchemb, is derived from الجنب al-janb, or الجانب al-jānib, 'the flank' or 'side'. and was also the traditional name for Gamma Pegasi. In 2016, the International Astronomical Union organized a Working Group on Star Names (WGSN) to catalog and standardize proper names for stars. The WGSN's first bulletin of July 2016 included a table of the first two batches of names approved by the WGSN; which included Mirfak for this star (Gamma Pegasi was given the name Algenib).

Hinaliʻi is the name of the star in Native Hawaiian astronomy. The name of the star is meant to commemorate a great tsunami and mark the beginning of the migration of Maui. According to some Hawaiian folklore, Hinaliʻi is the point of separation between the Earth and the sky that happened during the creation of the Milky Way.

Assemani alluded to a title on the Borgian globe, Mughammid (مغمد), or Muliammir al Thurayya (ملىمرٱلطرى), the Concealer of the Pleiades, which, from its location, may be for this star.

This star, together with γ Persei, δ Persei, η Persei, σ Persei and ψ Persei, has been called the Segment of Perseus.

Physical properties 

The spectrum of Alpha Persei matches a stellar classification of F5 Ib, revealing it to be a supergiant star in the latter stages of its evolution. It has a similar spectrum to Procyon A, though the latter star is much less luminous. This difference is highlighted in their spectral designation under the Yerkes spectral classification, published in 1943, where stars are ranked on luminosity as well as spectral typing. Procyon A is thus F5 IV, a subgiant star. Since 1943, the spectrum of Alpha Persei has served as one of the stable anchor points by which other stars are classified.

Alpha Persei has about 8.5 times the Sun's mass and has expanded to roughly 60 times the size of the Sun. In the Hertzsprung–Russell diagram, Alpha Persei lies inside the region in which Cepheid variables are found. It is thus useful in the study of these stars, which are important standard candles.

Unconfirmed exoplanet 

In 2010 evidence was presented of a planet orbiting Mirfak. Radial velocity data from repeated observations of the star found a periodic variation with an amplitude of 70.8 ± 1.6 m/s. The proposed planet is estimated to have a minimum mass of approximately 6.6 times that of Jupiter and an orbital period of 128 days, but the claimed period may not be stable over 20 years so the exoplanet is considered doubtful. Rotational modulation due to surface activity such as starspots seem a more likely explanation of the radial velocity variations. In previous publications, periodic radial velocity variations of 87.7 or 77.7 days have been reported, but these have not been confirmed.

References 

Persei, Alpha
Perseus (constellation)
F-type supergiants
Mirfak
Alpha Persei Cluster
Persei, 33
015863
1017
020902
BD+49 0917